Shirvan Shahlu (also Romanized as Shīrvān Shāhlū; also known as Shīravān Shāmnū) is a village in Gavdul-e Sharqi Rural District, in the Central District of Malekan County, East Azerbaijan Province, Iran. At the 2006 census, its population was 137, in 35 families.

See also 
 Ban Shirvan
 Bi Bi Shirvan
 Karkhaneh-ye Qand-e Shirvan
 Now Shirvan Kola
 Shirvan County
 Shirvan, Iran
 Shirvan, Lorestan
 Shirvan Mahalleh
 Shirvan Rural District
 Shirvan District

References 

Populated places in Malekan County